Cliniodes subflavescens is a moth in the family Crambidae. It was described by James E. Hayden in 2011. It is found in southern Brazil, north to the Federal District.

Adults have been recorded on wing in January, February, April, May and from September to December.

Etymology
The species name is derived from Latin subflavescere (meaning to become slightly yellow).

References

Moths described in 2011
Eurrhypini